The 1981 Cork Senior Football Championship was the 93rd staging of the Cork Senior Football Championship since its establishment by the Cork County Board in 1887. The championship began on 26 April 1981 and ended on 4 October 1981.

St. Finbarr's entered the championship as the defending champions, however, they were defeated by Nemo Rangers at the semi-final stage.

On 4 October 1981, Nemo Rangers won the championship following a 3-11 to 0-06 defeat of Bantry Blues in the final. This was their sixth championship title overall and their first title since 1978.

Pat O'Driscoll was the championship's top scorer with 2-31.

Format change

At the County Convention on 25 January 1981, it was decided to introduce a new graded draw with divisional, rural and city clubs all being grouped individually. The winners of the first two groupings progressed to one semi-final, with two of the city teams qualifying for the other semi-final. The new format was introduced to guarantee a city-county pairing in the final.

Results

Divisional section

Rural section

City section

Quarter-finals

Semi-finals

Final

Championship statistics

Top scorers

Overall

In a single game

Miscellaneous

 Bantry Blues qualify for the final for the first time since 1909.

References

Cork Senior Football Championship